Last of the Hipman is a live album by David Murray released on the Italian Red label. It was recorded in 1978 and features performances by Murray, Butch Morris, Johnny Dyani and George Brown. The album Let the Music Take You (1978) was recorded at the same concert.

Track listing
 "Monk’s Notice" (James Newton) - 21:41
 "Patricia" - 13:17
 "Last Of The Hipmen" - 10:34
All compositions by David Murray except as indicated
Recorded in concert in Rouen on January 30th 1978

Personnel
David Murray: tenor saxophone
Butch Morris: trumpet
Johnny Dyani: bass
George Brown: drums

References

1978 live albums
David Murray (saxophonist) live albums
Red Records live albums